Left Behind is a multimedia franchise that started with a series of 16 bestselling religious novels by Tim LaHaye and Jerry B. Jenkins. It focuses on a seven-year conflict between the Tribulation Force, an underground network of converts, and the New World Order-esque Global Community and its leader, Nicolae Carpathia, who is also the Antichrist. The primary element is a Christian dispensationalist view of the End Times; the pretribulation, premillennial, Christian eschatological interpretation of the Biblical apocalypse.

The series has been adapted into four films to date. The original series of three films are Left Behind: The Movie (2000), Left Behind II: Tribulation Force (2002), and Left Behind: World at War (2005). A reboot starring Nicolas Cage, entitled simply Left Behind, was released in 2014 through Cloud Ten Pictures. The series inspired an audio drama as well as the PC game Left Behind: Eternal Forces (2006) and its several sequels.

Books

Main series
Left Behind tells the story of the end times (set in the contemporary era), in which true believers in Christ have been raptured (taken instantly to heaven), leaving the world shattered and chaotic. As people scramble for answers, an obscure Romanian politician named Nicolae Jetty Carpathia rises to become secretary-general of the United Nations, promising to restore peace and stability to all nations. What most of the world does not realize is that Carpathia is actually the Antichrist foretold in the Bible. Coming to grips with the truth and becoming born-again Christians, airline pilot Rayford Steele, his daughter Chloe, their pastor Bruce Barnes, and young journalist Cameron "Buck" Williams begin their quest as the Tribulation Force to help save the lost and prepare for the coming Tribulation, in which God will rain down judgment on the world for seven years.

According to James Bielo, it is based on a dispensationalist interpretation of prophecies in the Biblical books of Revelation, Daniel, Isaiah and Ezekiel.

Characters

Influences on the authors
LaHaye and Jenkins cite the influence of Russell Doughten, an Iowa-based filmmaker who directed the Thief in the Night series, a series of four low-budget but popular feature-length films in the 1970s and 1980s about the Rapture and Second Coming, starting with 1972's A Thief in the Night.  Indeed, the title Left Behind echoes the refrain of Thief early Christian rock theme song by Larry Norman, "I Wish We'd All Been Ready," in which he sings, "There's no time to change your mind, the Son has come and you've been left behind."

Reception
Multiple books in the series have been on the New York Times Bestseller List.  Starting in 2000, Books 7 and 8 reached number one on the list followed by book 10, which debuted at number one.

In 2016, several books in the series were bestsellers and 65 million copies were sold in various languages.

Critical response
One reason often cited for the books' popularity is the quick pacing and action, and that they reflect the public's overall concern and fascination with the Apocalypse as portrayed in the Biblical Book of Revelation.  Michelle Goldberg has written that, "On one level, the attraction of the Left Behind books isn't that much different from that of, say, Tom Clancy or Stephen King. The plotting is brisk and the characterizations Manichaean. People disappear and things blow up." The New York Times also compared the series to Clancy's works. However, those views are not universally shared. Other reviewers have called the series "almost laughably tedious" and "fatuous and boring."

Jerry Falwell said about the first book in the series: "In terms of its impact on Christianity, it's probably greater than that of any other book in modern times, outside the Bible."

Laurie Goodstein, writing in 1998 for The New York Times, placed what she called the "Left Behind phenomenon" in the calendrical context of the approaching year 2000.  Goodstein noted a 'proliferation' of similarly apocalyptic texts appearing at that time, by authors such as Jim Bakker and John Hagee.  Goodstein cited the opinion of University of Wisconsin historian Paul Boyer,  who described such authors as "cashing in on the public preoccupation with the year 2000".

While writing that the series fulfills the norms of mass-market fiction, as mentioned above, magazine writer Michelle Goldberg characterized the books as an attack on Judaism and liberal secularism, and suggested that the near-future "end times" in which the books are set seem to reflect the actual worldview of millions of Americans, including many prominent conservative leaders.

Anti-Catholicism
The books are written from a Protestant viewpoint. As a result, some believe the books are anti-Catholic, noting that many Catholics were not raptured, concluding that no religion is free of false converts and that the new pope establishes a false religion. While the fictional Pope, John XXIV, was raptured, he is described as having embraced some of the views of the "Father of Protestantism", Martin Luther, and it is implied that he was raptured for this reason.  His successor, Pope Peter II, becomes Pontifex Maximus of Enigma Babylon One World Faith, an amalgam of all remaining world faiths and religions. Catholic Answers describes the series as anti-Catholic.

The co-author of the book, Jerry B. Jenkins, as well as LaHaye, stated that their books are not anti-Catholic and that they have many faithful Catholic readers and friends. According to LaHaye, "the books don’t suggest any particular theology, but try to introduce people to a more personal relationship with Jesus".

End-times theology
Along with some other rapture fiction novels, the Left Behind series demonstrates a specific understanding of the Gospel and the Christian life, one with which many have taken issue theologically. The books have not sold particularly well outside of the United States. Dispensationalism remains a minority view among theologians. For instance, amillennial and postmillennial Christians do not believe in the same timeline of the Second Coming as premillennialists, while preterist Christians do not interpret much of the Book of Revelation to predict future events at all. Brian McLaren of the Emergent Church compares the Left Behind series to The Da Vinci Code, and states, "What the Left Behind novels do, the way they twist scripture toward a certain theological and political end, I think [Dan] Brown is twisting scripture, just to other political ends." John Dart, writing in Christian Century, characterized the works as "beam me up theology."

Violence and war
Some practicing Christians, evangelical and otherwise, along with non-Christians have shown concern that the social perspectives promoted in the Left Behind series unduly sensationalize the death and destruction of masses of people. Harvey Cox, a professor of divinity at Harvard, says part of the appeal of the books lies in the "lip-licking anticipation of all the blood", and Lutheran theologian Barbara Rossing, author of The Rapture Exposed: The Message of Hope in the Book of Revelation, said the books glorify violence. Additionally, Paul Nuechterlein accused the authors of re-sacralizing violence, adding that "we human beings are the ones who put our faith in superior firepower. But in the Left Behind novels, the darkness of that human, satanic violence is once again attributed to God". Time said "the nuclear frights of, say, Tom Clancy's The Sum of All Fears wouldn't fill a chapter in the Left Behind series. (Large chunks of several U.S. cities have been bombed to smithereens by page 110 of Book 3.)"

David Carlson, a Professor of Religious Studies and a member of the Greek Orthodox Church, wrote that the theology underpinning the Left Behind series promotes a "skewed view of the Christian faith that welcomes war and disaster, while dismissing peace efforts in the Middle East and elsewhere—all in the name of Christ".

Left Behind: The Kids series 

Left Behind: The Kids is a series of forty novellas written for teenagers. It has the same plot as the adult series, but the main protagonists are teenagers.

Spinoff books
Williams professor Glenn Shuck has written the book Marks of the Beast: The Left Behind Novels and the Struggle for Evangelical Identity, published by NYU Press in 2005. He followed this with a collection of original essays co-edited with Jeffrey J. Kripal of Rice University on the Esalen Institute in California, published by Indiana University Press in 2005.

Starting in 2003 the series was expanded upon by Mel Odom with his Apocalypse military series and Neesa Hart with her political thriller series, both taking place concurrently with the main series

Graphic novels
In 2002, a series of graphic novels published by Tyndale House was launched that comprised the first two books in the series, Left Behind and Tribulation Force. The original idea was to release sets of 3 to 5 novels (each about 45–50 pages) for each book in the original series. However, after the fifth and final novel for Tribulation Force was released, the graphic novel series was apparently discontinued, and the novels that were released are now (as of December 2006) out of print. A compilation of the graphic novels for the first book was later released as one novel.

Film adaptations
The success of the Left Behind books has led to the release of four motion pictures based on the series so far. All four have been produced by brothers Paul & Peter LaLonde, and have been released through Cloud Ten Pictures, an independent Canadian-based Christian film studio.

The first, Left Behind: The Movie, was based on the first book of the series and was released in 2000. In a very unusual marketing scheme, the studio released the film on home video, and then theatrically. It fared poorly in theaters. The film starred former Growing Pains star Kirk Cameron as Buck Williams. Cameron, who praised the book series as "inspiring", became a practicing evangelist (and co-host with Ray Comfort on the TV show The Way of the Master).

The sequel, Left Behind II: Tribulation Force, based on the second book, Tribulation Force, was released in 2002. The film debuted at #2 on Nielson's video scan reports, behind Spider-Man, and was #1 in terms of overall sales for two days on Amazon.com.

The second sequel, World at War, was released first to churches on October 21, 2005, for church theatrical viewings and was released via home media on October 25. Much of the main cast from the previous two films, excluding Clarence Gilyard, reprised their respective roles for World at War. Gilyard, who played Bruce Barnes, was unable to return due to a scheduling conflict with a play in New York. It is based very loosely on the final 50 pages of Tribulation Force and features Louis Gossett Jr. as the President of the United States, Gerald Fitzhugh. The third installment was the least identifiable with events in any of the books. Recognizable events were the marriages of Buck with Chloe Steele, and of Rayford Steele with Amanda White; the death of Bruce Barnes; and President Fitzhugh's heading an attack, resulting in World War III, with Great Britain and Egypt fighting against the Global Community. Major parts, however, were taken from subsequent books; these events include the poisoning of Barnes by GC forces, instead of Nicolae Carpathia himself, and an attempt by Fitzhugh to assassinate Carpathia. Buck's meeting with the President in the books takes a different form in the film.

The film series have been criticized for, among other things, low production values. A Slate reviewer commented that in 2004, Cloud Ten Pictures made a deal with Sony Pictures Entertainment to release all of its pictures under their banner and has been doing so ever since.

In 2010, Cloud Ten announced that a remake of the Left Behind series was in development, with production set to begin in late 2012 for an October 2014 release date. The reboot, starring Nicolas Cage as Steele and Chad Michael Murray as Buck Williams, was released to theaters October 3, 2014. It focused mainly on the very beginnings of the first book and added much to the plot. The remake focuses on the experiences of the passengers on the plane and partially on Chloe Steele as she comes to terms with her missing family. It earned overwhelmingly negative reviews and flopped at the box office.

Vanished – Left Behind: Next Generation, a spin-off film based on the spin-off series Left Behind: The Kids released on September 28, 2016 The film was developed by Tim LaHaye's grandson, Randy LaHaye and was well received by the book author.

In November 2021, LaLonde announced the beginning of production on Left Behind: Rise of the Antichrist, with Kevin Sorbo directing and replacing Nicolas Cage as Rayford Steele. The film is set six months after the events of the 2014 film and is an adaptation of the rest of book one in the series. The film makes a few small changes to be more relevant for modern times.

Video game
A video game, Left Behind: Eternal Forces, (2006) and its three sequels, Left Behind: Tribulation Forces, Left Behind 3: Rise of the Antichrist and Left Behind 4: World at War, were developed by a publicly traded company, Left Behind Games. The games are real-time strategy games wherein the player controls a "Tribulation Forces" team and allows the player to "use the power of prayer to strengthen your troops in combat and wield modern military weaponry throughout the game world." The original game was released in the United States on November 14, 2006, and received mixed reviews. Distribution was initially planned to work through churches and megachurches.

Although the original game was accused of encouraging religious violence, not all reviewers of the game or critics of the Left Behind series shared that view. Representatives of the company have responded that the game's message is pacifist, because shooting nonbelievers instead of converting them costs the player "spirit points", which can be recovered by pausing to pray. The company also responded to these criticisms in an online newsletter, stating, "There is no violence, only conflict," and, "The most successful way to fight, is through the means of spiritual warfare; PRAYER and WORSHIP. Soldiers and military weaponry are available, but once anyone plays the game, they’ll see how difficult it is to succeed by using these less effective means of warfare."

Music

People Get Ready: A Musical Collection Inspired by The Left Behind Series (1998) is "a musical collection inspired by the Left Behind series."

See also

 Armageddon
 Christian theology
 Christian Zionism
 Covenantalism
 Futurism
 Hal Lindsey
 Historicism
 Idealism
 The Late, Great Planet Earth
 Summary of Christian eschatological differences
 Christian science fiction

References

Further reading
DeMar, Gary, Left Behind: Separating Fact from Fiction. Powder Springs, Georgia, 2009. 
Eford, James M. Left Behind? What the Bible Really Says about the End Times. Macon, Georgia, Smyth & Helys, 2006. 
Forbes, Bruce David and Jeanne Halgren Kilde (eds.), Rapture, Revelation, and the End Times: Exploring the Left Behind Series. New York: Palgrave Macmillan, 2004. 
Frykholm, Amy Johnson. Rapture Culture: Left Behind in Evangelical America. Oxford University Press, 2004.  

Olson, Carl E. Will Catholics be Left Behind? San Francisco, Ignatius Press, 2003. 
Standaert, Michael, 2006 Skipping Towards Armageddon: The Politics and Propaganda of the Left Behind Novels and the LaHaye Empire (Soft Skull Press)
Rossing, Barbara R., The Rapture Exposed: The Message of Hope in the Book of Revelation, New York: Basic Books, 2004. 
Shuck, Glenn W. Marks Of The Beast: The Left Behind Novels And The Struggle For Evangelical Identity. New York University Press, 2004. 
Gribben, Crawford, Rapture Fiction and the Evangelical Crisis. Evangelical Press, 2006. .
Snow Flesher, LeAnn, Left Behind? The Facts Behind the Fiction. Valley Forge, Judson Press, 2006. 
Tuley, Glenn, Not Left Behind: A Tribulation Survival Manual. Bedford, TX, Burkhart Books, 2015.

External links
Official website
Archive of Left Behind radio shows in RealAudio
WELS Topical Q&A: Left Behind Series (a Confessional Lutheran perspective)
Slacktivist blog analysis and critique of Left Behind

American post-apocalyptic novels
American Christian novels
American novels adapted into films
Apocalyptic fiction
Book series introduced in 1995
Christian Zionism
Dystopian novels
 
Novel series
Tyndale House books
Rapture
Controversies in Christian literature

pl:Dzień zagłady (utwór)
zh:末日迷蹤